Mervyl Samuel Melendez Sr. is a Puerto Rican baseball coach and former third base and as a relief pitcher. He played college baseball for the Bethune-Cookman Wildcats from 1993–1996. He then served as the head coach of Bethune-Cookman (2000–2011), the Alabama State Hornets (2012–2016) and the FIU Panthers (2017–2022).

Melendez played for Bethune-Cookman from 1993 through 1996, seeing time at third base and relief pitching.  At his playing career's end, he held program records in doubles (30) and batting average (.342).  Melendez earned all-conference and all-tournament honors in 1995 and 1996.  Following the end of his playing career, Melendez became an assistant coach for the Wildcats. During his tenure as an assistant, the team won the 1999 MEAC Tournament.

Prior to accepting the job at Alabama State, Melendez was the head coach at Bethune-Cookman, leading his alma mater to eleven Mid-Eastern Athletic Conference championships in his twelve seasons.  As coach at Bethune-Cookman, Melendez led the team two back-to-back undefeated conference seasons in 2010 and 2011.  His teams also won the Mid-Eastern Athletic Conference baseball tournament every year from 2000 through 2011, with the exception of 2005.  He won 379 games as coach of the Wildcats, and in 2009 became the second-youngest coach in NCAA history to win 300 games. He resigned following the conclusion of the 2022 season from FIU.

Head coaching record
The following is a table of Melendez's yearly records as an NCAA head baseball coach.

References

Bethune–Cookman Wildcats baseball coaches
Bethune–Cookman Wildcats baseball players
Alabama State Hornets baseball coaches
Living people
Baseball pitchers
Baseball third basemen
People from Carolina, Puerto Rico
1974 births
FIU Panthers baseball coaches